Luca Vido (born 3 February 1997) is an Italian professional footballer who plays as a forward for  club Palermo, on loan from Atalanta.

Club career
Vido made his professional debut in the Serie B for Cittadella on 4 February 2017 in a game against Pro Vercelli.

On 27 July 2018, Vido signed to Serie B side Perugia on loan from Atalanta until 30 June 2019.

On 31 July 2019, he joined Crotone on loan. On 13 January 2020, he moved on a new loan to Pisa, also in Serie B. The loan was renewed for the 2020–21 season on 10 September 2020. On 12 July 2021, he moved on loan to Cremonese, once again in Serie B. On 31 January 2022, Vido moved on loan to SPAL.

On 1 September 2022, Vido was loaned out to Serie B club Palermo, with an option to buy.

International career
Vido represented Italy U17 national team at the 2013 UEFA European Under-17 Championship, where Italy was the runner-up, and at the 2013 FIFA U-17 World Cup.

With the Italy U20 he took part at the 2017 FIFA U-20 World Cup.

On 4 September 2017, he made his debut with the Italy U21 in a friendly match against Slovenia.

Career statistics

Club

Honours
Italy U20
FIFA U-20 World Cup bronze medals:2017

References

External links
 

Living people
1997 births
People from Bassano del Grappa
Sportspeople from the Province of Vicenza
Italian footballers
Footballers from Veneto
Association football forwards
Italy under-21 international footballers
Italy youth international footballers
Serie A players
Serie B players
A.S. Cittadella players
Atalanta B.C. players
A.C. Perugia Calcio players
F.C. Crotone players
Pisa S.C. players
U.S. Cremonese players
S.P.A.L. players
Palermo F.C. players